Knowledge Park II or Knowledge Park 2 is sector in south-western Greater Noida, Uttar Pradesh, India. Bordered by Knowledge Park I to the east, Knowledge Park III to the north and Sector 150, Noida to the west, it serves the Knowledge Park II metro station alongside numerous private and public institutes, including Galgotias College, Greater Noida Institute of Technology (GNIOT) and Mangalmay Institute of Engineering and Technology.

References 

Geography of Uttar Pradesh